Jackie Barnett Presents One of Those Songs is a 1966 album by Jimmy Durante, with arrangements by Ernie Freeman. The cover depicts Durante embracing CeCe, his adopted daughter with his second wife, Margie. The song "Margie" is dedicated to his wife.

Durante's musical partner Eddie Jackson accompanies him on "Bill Bailey (Won't You Please Come Home)".

Track listing
 "One of Those Songs" – 2:52
 "You're Nobody till Somebody Loves You" (Russ Morgan, Larry Stock, James Cavanaugh) – 2:25
 "Bill Bailey (Won't You Please Come Home)" (Hughie Cannon) – 2:30
 "What Became of Life" – 3:00
 "Margie" – 2:40
 "Old Man Time" (Cliff Friend) – 2:30
 "We're Going U.F.O.-ing" – 2:25
 "Daddy (Your Mama Is Lonesome For You)" (Jimmy Durante, Chris Smith, Bob Schafer) – 1:40
 "This Train" – 2:40
 "Mame" – 2:25

Personnel
Jimmy Durante – vocals
Eddie Jackson – vocals on "Bill Bailey (Won't You Please Come Home)"
Ernie Freeman – arranger, conductor
Ed Thrasher – art direction
Otto Storch – cover photography
Dick Glasser, Jimmy Hilliard – producer

References

External links
 

1966 albums
Albums arranged by Ernie Freeman
Albums conducted by Ernie Freeman
Albums produced by Dick Glasser
Jimmy Durante albums
Warner Records albums